Soumen Mitra (born 16 December 1961) is an Indian police officer, who is serving as 43rd Police Commissioner of Kolkata on 8 February 2021, in the rank of DGP. Being an IPS officer, he was at 1988 cadre of IPS service from West Bengal.

Early life and career 
Born in 1961 in Kolkata, Mitra was educated at St. Xavier's Collegiate School, Kolkata, Presidency College, Kolkata and Jawaharlal Nehru University, New Delhi, completing his BA, MA and M.Phil. A graduate of History, he qualified for the Civil Services and was allotted the Indian Police Service, belonging to the 1988-batch in the West Bengal cadre.

 A probationer in Darjeeling
 Asst Commissioner of Police, Operations, Darjeeling
 Sub-divisional Police Officer (SDPO), Barrackpore
 Additional Superintendent of Police, Murshidabad
 Additional Superintendent of Police, Asansol
 Deputy Commissioner of Police, (Special), Detective Department, Kolkata Police
 Superintendent of Police, Murshidabad
 Deputy Commissioner of Police, North Division, Kolkata Police 
 Superintendent of Police, Howrah
 Deputy Commissioner of Police, Detective Department, Kolkata Police
 Joint Commissioner of Police, (Organization), Kolkata Police
 Deputy Inspector General of Police, Criminal Investigation Department
 Deputy Inspector General of Police, Presidency Range
 Inspector General of Police, Criminal Investigation Department
 Additional Commissioner of Police II, Kolkata Police
 Special Commissioner of Police, Kolkata Police
 Additional Director General of Police, Criminal Investigation Department
 Commissioner of Police, Kolkata Police
 Additional Director General of Police and Inspector General of Police, Training
 Commissioner of Police, Kolkata Police

Beginning his career in Darjeeling in 1989, he has held a vast number of posts as mentioned before: consecutive superintendents of police, experience in the C.I.D, head of the Detective Department and extensive work as a senior officer in Kolkata Police.

Mitra took over as Commissioner of Police, Kolkata on 13 April 2016 and held the afore-mentioned office till 21 May 2016.

Transfer to the Post of Police Commissioner 
Around the end of January 2016 in a major police reshuffle Rajeev Kumar, the ADG (CID) was made the Commissioner of Police to succeed Surajit Kar Purakayastha. As result Mitra being a batch senior to Kumar, was transferred to CID as its ADG.

However, because of various reasons he was removed by the Election Commission of India on 12 April 2016 and replaced with Soumen Mitra, who took charge on 13 April 2016.

Transfer out from the Post of Police Commissioner 
On 21 May, just two days after the Trinamool Congress came back to power with a majority of 211 seats, Mitra was removed by Nabanna to the post of ADG & IGP Training, and his predecessor Rajeev Kumar was brought back to the post.

Widespread recognition 

After being brought in as the Commissioner of Police by the Election Commission, Mitra received widespread fame and recognition as "an able person who worked free of all political and other influences as a fair officer". Under his leadership, the two phases of elections held in Kolkata were conducted without any trouble or violence. Appearing very frequently on the front-pages of newspapers and in magazines, he soon became an "icon of honesty and integrity and a hero for everyone to look up to.

Other interests 
Mitra takes keen interest in social welfare issues, heritage and wildlife conservation. He is very popular among the police force for his professionalism, modern outlook and welfare schemes. He has taken initiatives in many places around West Bengal for rehabilitation of heritage buildings and heritage protection and recognition. He masterminded the recovery of 112 Ripon Street, Kolkata, Police Training School, Kolkata and many police stations and traffic guards throughout the city.

He has also worked with and been closely associated with numerous international organizations including the World Health Organization, the Bill and Melinda Gates Foundation and the Joint United Nations Programme on HIV/AIDS.

Besides this, he has a keen interest in sports, both writing about it as well as being a sportsman himself. He was part of his school and college cricket and football teams, leading Presidency College as its captain in cricket. He is also a school and college chess champion.

His restoration and repair of Government House, Barrackpore, the previous residence of the Governors-General of British India, was awarded the Heritage Conservation Award 2018-19 by the Indian National Trust for Art and Cultural Heritage (INTACH). In 2020, he featured as a guest on the episode entitled "India" of Michael Portillo's Channel 5 documentary 'Portillo's Empire Journey', shedding light on Empire, Barrackpore, the Government House and its history, and his own restoration of the building and grounds.

Literary works 
Mitra's M Phil dissertation has been published as a book entitled In Search of an Identity: The History of Football in Colonial Calcutta, 1880–1950.

In 2019 he collaborated with his wife, Monabi Mitra, in writing 'Under The Banyan Tree: The Forgotten Story of Barrackpore Park', narrating the two hundred year-old history of Government House Barrackpore. It documented its days of glory as the weekend retreat of the Governors-General of British India, its fall to decay and ruin after Independence as a police hospital, and the recent restoration of the main house and its grounds.

Personal life 
Soumen Mitra is married and resides in Kolkata. His wife, Monabi Mitra, is a professor of English and a crime novelist who has written several police procedurals.

See also
IPS
Police
Surajit Kar Purkayastha

References

1961 births
Living people
Indian Police Service officers
Jawaharlal Nehru University alumni